Naved, Nabed, Nahbed, or Nabedes (Greek:  Nabédēs) was a Sasanian military commander during the reign of Khosrow I.

He is first recorded as the commander of Nisibis, engaging the Romans in a battle during Belisarius invasion of Mesopotamia in 541. Procopius quotes Belisarius as describing Nabedes to be the "first among the Persians in glory and in every other sort of honour" after Khosrow I himself. In 543, Nabedes and his outnumbered forces defeated a major Byzantine invasion of Armenia in an ambush at Anglon. During the Lazic War, he performed an invasion in 550, reaching Abasgia and taking hostages, including the wife of Opsites of Lazica.

References

Lazic War
6th-century Iranian people
Sasanian Armenia
Nusaybin
Generals of Khosrow I
People of the Roman–Sasanian Wars
History of Abkhazia